Blaise Ingoglia (born November 4, 1970) is an American politician who currently serves as a member of the Florida Senate, representing the 11th district, since 2022. A member of the Republican Party, he previously served in the Florida House of Representatives from 2014 to 2022 in the 35th district, as well as chairman of the Republican Party of Florida from 2015 to 2019.

In February 2023, Ingoglia introduced a bill that would eliminate the Florida Democratic Party.

History
Ingoglia was born in Queens in New York City, and attended Queens College, studying economics and accounting, and Brooklyn College, studying biology, but he did not graduate. In 1996, he moved to Spring Hill, Florida and started the companies America One Mortgage and Hartland Homes. He ran for office 2008, spending nearly fifty thousand dollars of his own money "to unseat the career, big-government, tax-and-spend county commissioners from office that refused to offer property tax relief," an effort that was ultimately successful. Ingoglia was elected as the Chairman of the Hernando County Republican Executive Committee in 2009, and then was elected the Vice-Chairman of the Republican Party of Florida in 2011. In 2016 Ingoglia stepped down as Chairman of the Hernando County Republican Party when he was elected State Committeeman for Hernando County.

Florida House of Representatives
In 2014, incumbent State Representative Robert C. Schenck was unable to seek re-election due to term limits, so Ingoglia ran to succeed him. He won the Republican primary unopposed, and faced Democratic nominee Rose Rocco, a former Hernando County Commissioner, and independent candidates James Scavetta and Hamilton R. Hanson in the general election. Ultimately, Ingoglia defeated his opponents by a wide margin, winning 51% of the vote to Rocco's 42%, Scavetta's 4%, and Hanson's 3%.

Following his election to the legislature, Ingoglia announced that he would seek election as the Chairman of the Republican Party of Florida, and successfully challenged and defeated the incumbent Chairwoman, Leslie Dougher.

Ingoglia and other Republicans proposed changes to restrict voting rights in Florida. The proposed changes to restrict mail-in voting were notable given that Republicans had traditionally voted by mail more than Democrats, but Democrats outvoted Republicans by mail in 2020. Asked about cases of voter fraud, Ingoglia said, "I don’t know, but I'm sure it was going on. Just the fact that they weren’t caught doesn’t necessarily mean that it's not happening."

Ingoglia also proposed legislation that prohibit technology companies from "deplatforming" political candidates (several social media companies had removed President Donald Trump from their platform after he used the platforms to spread falsehoods about the 2020 election and foment violence). Ingoglia made an exemption for The Walt Disney Company, which runs Walt Disney World in Florida.

Florida Senate
In 2022, Ingoglia was term-limited in the state house and ran for the Florida Senate in the 11th district, succeeding Republican Senate president Wilton Simpson. He ran against Green nominee Brian Moore in the general election, defeating him with 75% of the vote.

In February 2023, Ingoglia filed SB 1248, titled the "Ultimate Cancel Act," that would cancel the filings of any political party that previously supported slavery or involuntary servitude, automatically changing the registration of affected voters to "no party affiliation." The bill was created in an attempt to outlaw the Florida Democratic Party, which historically supported slavery before and during the American Civil War, as well as a criticism of cancel culture, stating that it would be "hypocritical not to cancel the Democrat Party itself."

References

External links

Florida House of Representatives - Blaise Ingoglia
Blaise Ingoglia for State Representative
 

1970 births
2016 United States presidential electors
21st-century American politicians
Brooklyn College alumni
Living people
Republican Party members of the Florida House of Representatives
Republican Party Florida state senators
People from Spring Hill, Florida
Politicians from New York City
Queens College, City University of New York alumni
State political party chairs of Florida